The 2010 House elections in Iowa occurred on November 2, 2010 and elected the members of the State of Iowa's delegation to the United States House of Representatives. Representatives are elected for two-year terms; those elected served in the 112th Congress from January 3, 2011 until January 3, 2013. Iowa has five seats in the House, apportioned according to the 2000 United States Census.

These elections were held concurrently with the United States Senate elections of 2010 (including one in Iowa), the United States House elections in other states, and various state and local elections.  All five of Iowa's incumbent representatives were re-elected. Until 2018, this was 
the last time in which Democrats won a majority of congressional districts in Iowa.

Overview

By district
Results of the 2010 United States House of Representatives elections in Iowa by district:

District 1

Campaign
In this liberal-leaning district based in northeastern Iowa, incumbent Democratic Congressman Bruce Braley ran for a third term against Republican attorney Ben Lange, Libertarian Rob Petsche, and independent candidate Jason Faulkner. Though Braley was overwhelmingly re-elected to his second term two years prior, the anti-Democratic mood in the country contributed to the Congressman experiencing a tough fight for re-election. The race attracted the attention of both national party organizations, and thousands of dollars were reserved for airtime by the DCCC and the NRCC. Though Braley emerged victorious on election day, it was by a slim 4,000 vote  and two percent margin, which was the thinnest margin of victory out of the entire Iowa congressional delegation.

Polling

Results

District 2

Campaign
In a rematch from 2008, incumbent Democratic Congressman Dave Loebsack faced Republican challenger Mariannette Miller-Meeks when he ran for a third term in this southeastern Iowa-based district, the most liberal of the congressional districts in the state. Polling indicated that the race would be close, and both parties’ congressional campaign committees spent on television advertisements, but ultimately, Congressman Loebsack defeated Miller-Meeks by a 10,000 vote, five percent margin.

Polling

Results

District 3

Campaign
Incumbent Democratic Congressman Leonard Boswell ran for an eighth term in this marginally liberal district that includes parts of the Waterloo – Cedar Falls metropolitan area, metro Des Moines, and Cedar Rapids. Congressman Boswell, who has faced difficult elections every year, faced Republican State Senator Brad Zaun in the general election. Though early polling indicated that Boswell was in trouble, he managed to turn the tide and edged out Zaun by a four percent margin.

Polling

Results

District 4

Campaign
Though Republican Congressman Tom Latham represents a centrist district, he has never had much trouble winning re-election since he was first elected in 1994. This year, Congressman Latham faced the Democratic nominee, Bill Maske, a school superintendent, and independent candidate Dan Lensing. Latham was never in peril of losing his seat and managed to crush Maske and Lensing to win a ninth term in Congress.

Results

District 5

Campaign
Congressman Steve King, a Republican, represents the most conservative district in Iowa, which is rooted in the staunchly conservative areas of western Iowa. King is an outspoken conservative seeking his fifth term in Congress, and he faced Democrat Matthew Campbell in the general election. Though Democrats had high hopes for Campbell’s campaign, he was ultimately not able to beat back the conservative tendencies of the district and lost to King in a landslide.

Results

References

External links
Elections from the Iowa Secretary of State
June 8, 2010 Primary Election Results
U.S. Congress Candidates for Iowa at Project Vote Smart
Iowa U.S. House from OurCampaigns.com
Campaign contributions for U.S. Congressional races in Iowa from OpenSecrets

Iowa
2010
2010 Iowa elections